The 1999 Mid-American Conference Championship Game was played on December 3, 1999, at Marshall Stadium, now known as Joan C. Edwards Stadium, in Huntington, West Virginia.  The game featured the winner of each division of the Mid-American Conference. The game featured the Marshall Thundering Herd, of the East Division, and the Western Michigan Broncos, of the West Division. The Thundering Herd came back from a 23−0 third-quarter deficit to defeat the Broncos 34−30, preserving Marshall's perfect season.

Teams

Western Michigan

Western Michigan entered the championship game as West Division champions, having compiled a 7–4 record, 6–2 record in MAC play. The Broncos started the season 7–2 and 6–0 in MAC play before losing the final two games of the regular season, including a 31–17 loss to Marshall on November 13.

Marshall

Marshall entered the championship game as East Division champions, having compiled an undefeated 11–0 record, 8–0 record in MAC play. Marshall has spent eleven consecutive weeks the AP Top 25 after defeating Bowling Green on September 18. They entered the MAC Championship game at No. 11 in the AP and Coaches poll.

Game summary

Statistics

References

Championship Game
MAC Championship Game
Marshall Thundering Herd football games
Western Michigan Broncos football games
December 1999 sports events in the United States
MAC Championship